The National Union of Conservative and Constitutional Associations (NUCCA) was an organization set up by Benjamin Disraeli. It is considered to be a precursor to the modern Conservative Party conference.
Unless otherwise stated, details of Chairmen and Presidents of the NUCCA are taken from British Historical Facts 1830-1900 by Chris Cook and Brendan Keith or from British Political Facts 1900-1994 by David Butler and Gareth Butler, as appropriate.

Presidents of National Union of Conservative and Constitutional Associations
1868: The Earl of Dartmouth (also served in 1884)
1869: The Lord Skelmersdale (also served in 1891 when he had been created the Earl of Lathom)
1870 - 1871: The Earl of Feversham
1872: The Duke of Abercorn
1873: The Lord Wharncliffe
1874: The Lord Hampton
1875: The Lord Colchester
1876: The Marquess of Abergavenny
1877: The Lord Winmarleigh
1878: The Earl Cadogan
1879: The Earl Manvers
1880: The Marquess of Hertford
1881: The Marquess of Salisbury
1882: The Duke of Northumberland
1883: The Duke of Beaufort
1884: The Earl of Dartmouth (also served in 1868)
1885: The Duke of Norfolk
1886: The Baron Tredegar
1887: The Earl of Londesborough
1888: The Earl of Jersey
1889: The Earl of Dartmouth
1890: The Duke of Portland
1891: The Earl of Lathom (had also served in 1869 when he was known as the Lord Skelmersdale)
1892: The Lord Windsor (also served as Chairman in 1900 and as President in 1908, when he was known as the Earl of Plymouth)
1893: The Earl of Scarbrough
1894: The Earl of Dunraven
1895: The Marquess of Londonderry
1896: The Duke of Norfolk (also served in 1904)
1897: The Earl of Derby (also served in 1903)
1898: The Earl Cadogan
1899: The Duke of Beaufort
1900: The Marquess of Zetland
1901: The Lord Llangattock
1902: The Earl of Dartmouth
1903: The Earl of Derby (had also served in 1897)
1904: The Duke of Norfolk (had also served in 1896)
1905: The Lord Montagu
1906 - 1907: The Duke of Northumberland
1908: The Earl of Plymouth (had also served as President in 1892 and as Chairman in 1900, when he was known as the Lord Windsor)
1909: The Earl Cawdor
1910: The Earl of Derby
1911: The Duke of Portland

Chairmen of National Union of Conservative and Constitutional Associations
1867: John Eldon Gorst MP
1868: Viscount Holmesdale MP (later became Earl Amherst)
1869 - 1874: Henry Cecil Raikes MP
1875: Viscount Mahon MP (later became Earl Stanhope)
1876 -1878: Lord Claud Hamilton MP
1879 - 1883: Earl Percy MP
1884: Lord Randolph Churchill MP and Sir Michael Hicks Beach MP
1885: Lord Claud Hamilton MP
1886 - 1888: Ellis Ashmead-Bartlett MP
1889: Sir Albert Kaye Rollit MP
1890: Frederick Dixon-Hartland MP
1891: Henry Byron Reed MP
1892: Charles Beilby Stuart-Wortley MP
1893: Sir Henry Stafford Northcote MP (later became the Lord Northcote)
1894: James Rankin MP
1895: Sir Charles Edward Howard Vincent MP
1896: Marquess of Granby (also served in 1907 when he had become Duke of Rutland)
1897: Arthur Hugh Smith-Barry MP (later became the Lord Barrymore)
1898: Sir John Benjamin Stone MP
1899: Gerald Walter Erskine Loder MP
1900: The Lord Windsor (later became Earl of Plymouth)
1901: Sir Alfred Hickman MP
1902: Sir Charles Daniel Cave
1903: Francis William Lowe MP
1904: Henry Ferryman Bowles MP
1905: Sir Walter Richard Plummer MP
1906: Henry Imbert-Terry
1907: The Duke of Rutland (had also served in 1896 when he was known as Marquess of Granby)
1908: Sir Robert Hodge
1909: Sir Thomas Wrightson
1910: Henry Chaplin MP (later became Viscount Chaplin)
1911: The Lord Kenyon

References

Organisations associated with the Conservative Party (UK)
Benjamin Disraeli